Phebronia of Nisibis, also known as Phebronia of Sebapte, was a nun at Nisibis (modern-day Nusaybin, Turkey). She suffered persecution under Diocletian, who offered her freedom if she renounced her faith and married his nephew, Lysimachus, who had been leaning towards conversion to Christianity. Febronia refused and was tortured, suffered mutilation and death. Lysimachus, witnessing her suffering, converted.

Saint Phebronia's tomb can be found in a monastery named after her in the village of Himo, near the city of Qamishli in northeastern Syria.

Phebronia is one of the 140 Colonnade saints whose images adorn St. Peter's Square. She is known as a Holy Virgin Martyr.

In the Coptic Orthodox Church, her feast day is 1 Epip which corresponds to 8 July (Gregorian Calendar) or 25 June (Julian Calendar).

References

External links

Special St. Febronia Worldwide
French Version of the Greek Original, after 1721, Metz

284 births
304 deaths
Mesopotamian saints
4th-century Christian martyrs
3rd-century Roman women
4th-century Roman women
People executed by the Roman Empire